Kantilal Ghia was a leader of Indian National Congress from Gujarat. He was the First deputy chief minister in Government of Gujarat in early 1970s.

References

Year of birth missing
Possibly living people
Deputy chief ministers of Gujarat
Politicians from Ahmedabad
Gujarat MLAs 1967–1971
Leaders of the Opposition in Gujarat
Indian National Congress politicians from Gujarat